Fan Yang (born 1962) is a Canadian bubble artist.

Early life
Fan Yang was born in Vietnam in 1962; his mother is a Haiphong native.

Career
He has earned international acclaim as a result of his complex displays of bubble theater. In addition to performing, he has developed his own bubble solution formulas and equipment to create bubbles. Fan Yang has broken bubble-related world records on numerous occasions. Yang produces a show, the Gazillion Bubble Show, in New York City, and has staged it elsewhere, including Las Vegas. His wife, Ana Yang, performs the show in his absence.

World records 
Fan's first 11 world records are all unique in the field of bubbles.

 Berlin, Germany, 1992: The largest spherical soap bubble. (2.3 m circumference)
 Pacific Science Center Seattle, Washington, August 11, 1997: The world’s largest bubble wall. (47.4 m lengthwise)
 Hollywood, California, May 5, 1999: The most bubbles inside 9 concentric bubbles, inside each other.
 Paris, France, March 29, 2000: The most bubbles inside 11 concentric bubbles inside each other.
 Wavrin, France, April 1, 2000: Passage into a bubble hemisphere. His daughter slid into a bubble hemisphere going through the bubble film without bursting it.
 Helsinki, Finland, October 20, 2001: Record for the most concentric bubbles. (12 domes)
 Stockholm, Sweden, November 27, 2001: Record for the most bubbles attached on each other in mid air (9).
 Santa Ana, California, April 7, 2004: World record for The Most People Inside A Soap Bubble (8 people)
 New York City, U.S., March 18, 2005: Guinness World Record for the most people inside a soap bubble at Toys 'R' Us
 Santa Ana, California, April 12, 2006: Encapsulating 15 pairs of people in their own bubble cubicles for 5 seconds and linking them together to create a "Mega Bubble Cage"
 Madrid, Spain, May 25, 2006: Encapsulating 22 people inside a single soap bubble.
 Chicago, United States, January 30, 2008: Encapsulating 100 people inside a single soap bubble on The Oprah Winfrey Show.

Television performances 
 Late Night with David Letterman; NBC
 The Ellen DeGeneres Show; NBC
 Jerry Lewis MDA Telethon; CBS
 The Statler Brothers Show; TNN
 Disney-MGM
 NHK-TV; Japan
 RAI-TV; Italy
 Canale 5; Italy
 ZDF-TV; Germany
 TF-1; France
 Nickelodeon-Universal Studios, Florida U.S.A.
 Television Chile Guinness Prime Time
 FOX TV, CCTV Beijing, China
 Television Corporation of Singapore (TCS)
 TLC; U.S.A., (The Learning Channel)
 LWT (London Weekend Television); CCTV
 BBC; Canada
 Cirque du Soleil "Soltrom" 
 SBS, South Korea
 Beirut, Lebanon (Biel)
 Ordinary/Extraordinary, Florida, 1996

Corporate performances 
 Mercedes Benz
 IBM
 Hugo Boss
 L’Oreal
 BMW
 Chrysler
 Omega
 Audi
 Carl Zeiss
 Siemens
 Pepsi

References

External links 
 Science of Bubbles
 World Records with Soap Bubbles
 Review by Barbara Mehlman and Geri Manus on New York Theatre Guide - Online
 First bubble show in Russia

1962 births
Canadian entertainers
Living people
Vietnamese emigrants to Canada
People from Haiphong